Pycnotarsa sulphurea is a moth in the family Oecophoridae. It was described by August Busck in 1914. It is found in Panama.

The wingspan is about 30 mm. The forewings are glossy white with a strong violet sheen and overlaid with yellow scales. The extreme base of the costa, a longitudinal central line from the base to the termen and the apical edge are all reddish yellow. The hindwings are glistening light violet yellow.

References

Moths described in 1914
Pycnotarsa